Stenocatantops angustifrons, the common tropical sharptail, is a species of short-horned grasshopper in the family Acrididae. It is found in Southeast Asia and Oceania.

References

External links

 

Catantopinae